Angus McLeod (February 5, 1857 – November 18, 1902) was a farmer, lumber merchant and political figure in Ontario, Canada. He represented Ontario North in the House of Commons of Canada from 1900 to 1902 as a Liberal-Conservative.

Born in Campbellville, Canada West, he served on the town council for Bracebridge. McLeod was an unsuccessful candidate for a seat in the House of Commons in 1897.

He married Hannah Langford in 1886. McLeod died in office at the age of 45 while travelling on business in British Columbia.

References 

Members of the House of Commons of Canada from Ontario
Conservative Party of Canada (1867–1942) MPs
1857 births
1902 deaths